Ken Ghosh is an Indian Hindi film director and screenwriter. He also produces films and TV serials.

Filmography

References

External links

1966 births
Living people
Film directors from Mumbai
21st-century Indian film directors
Hindi-language film directors